Giuliana Salce (born 16 June 1955 in Rome) is a retired female race walker from Italy. Her greatest achievement was the 1985 World Indoor gold medal.

In her career she set three world records in the beginning of the women's racewalking.

Biography
She won three medal, at senior level, at the International athletics competitions. She has 17 caps in national team from 1979 to 1987.

After her career in athletics, she tried to go cycling master, but after some time has been involved in an ugly story of doping, after the inevitable disqualification is taken the complaint to the person who was involved and the publication of a book, Dalla vita inn  giù, 2011.

World record
Outdoor
5 km walk: 21:51:85 ( L'Aquila, 1 October 1983)
5 km walk: 21:35:25 ( Verona, 19 June 1986)

Indoor
3 km walk: 12:31:57 ( Florence, 6 February 1985)

Achievements

National titles
Salce won 12 national championships at individual senior level.

Italian Athletics Championships
5000 m walk (track): 1982, 1983, 1984, 1987 (4)
10 km walk: 1984 (1)
Italian Indoor Athletics Championships
3000 m walk: 1981, 1982, 1983, 1984, 1985, 1986, 1987 (7)

References

External links
 
 Giuliana Salce at La marcia nel mondo 

1955 births
Living people
Italian female racewalkers
Athletes from Rome
World Athletics Championships athletes for Italy
Italian masters athletes
World Athletics Indoor Championships winners
World Athletics Indoor Championships medalists